Mary McPhillips may refer to:
 Mary M. McPhillips, member of the New York State Assembly
 Mary Helen McPhillips, Canadian television personality